Uperodon triangularis is a species of narrow-mouthed frog (family Microhylidae) found in southwestern India. They are endemic to the Western Ghats, where they are known to breed in water collected in tree hollows. The advertisement calls of males is made up of about 30 pulses of 0.38 second duration with a frequency range of 0.6 and 1.1 kHz. These are emitted every three seconds.

References

External links

triangularis
Frogs of India
Endemic fauna of the Western Ghats
Amphibians described in 1876
Taxa named by Albert Günther